Port of New York is a 1949 American film noir/crime film directed by László Benedek with cinematography by George E. Diskant and shot in semidocumentary style. The film is notable for being Yul Brynner's first film appearance. The film, which is very similar to T-Men (1947), was shot on location in New York City.

Plot
Narrator Chet Huntley introduces two federal agents, Mickey Waters of the  U.S. Customs Service and Jim Flannery of the Federal Bureau of Narcotics. They are  out to stop the distribution of an opium shipment stolen from the S.S. Florentine in the Port of New York. The leader of the thieves is the suave drug dealer Paul Vicola (Brynner).

The ship’s purser was murdered in the heist. Toni Cardell was a passenger on the ship and girlfriend of Vicola. She played a part in the smuggling, is upset about the murder, and wants out. When Vicola refuses to stake her for a new life elsewhere, Toni calls the police to become an informant. She has a rendezvous on a subway platform with Flannery to plan another meeting, but Vicola garrotes her before she can complete her plans. She had a train reservation, so police search all the lockers at Penn Station and find a parcel of opium. They stake out the locker and follow the pick-up man to a nightclub. He is comic Dolly Carney, who discloses under police pressure his contact, Leo Stasser, at the North River Yacht marina. Carney's friend, a dancer at the nightclub named Lili Long, observed his arrest by Waters and Flannery, and, on a tip from the nightclub owner, goes to Vicola for help.

The agents stake out Stasser at his harbor marina. Waters slips in under cover of working on a boat there. That night, they search Stasser's office and find he has all the lab supplies ready to cut the "junk." Flannery also finds a message from a G.W. Wyley about the drug deal. Stasser and his men return and find Waters, but Flannery escapes. The next day Waters’ body is found floating in the bay. Stasser bails Carney out of jail, then throws him out the window of his high-rise apartment.

En route to New York to complete the drug deal, Wyley is arrested during a layover at the airport in Chicago. Impersonating him, Flannery arrives at La Guardia as scheduled. As the deal proceeds on Vicola's yacht, Lili Long comes to him to find out why Carney would have killed himself. She exposes Flannery as a cop, and a shootout ensues. The yacht flees, it is pursued by the Coast Guard, and Vicola and his gang are apprehended.

Cast

Reception

Critical response
In 1998 the film critic of The Austin Chronicle offered a mixed review,  stating: 

In 2007 Oszus film critic Dennis Schwartz also gave the film a mixed review, writing:

References

External links

 
 
 
 
 Port of New York informational site and DVD review at DVD Beaver (includes images)
 

1949 films
1949 crime films
American black-and-white films
Film noir
Films about the illegal drug trade
Films directed by László Benedek
Films set in New York City
Films shot in New York City
Eagle-Lion Films films
Films scored by Sol Kaplan
American crime films
Films about opium
1940s English-language films
1940s American films